Checkout may refer to:

 a point of sale terminal
 Google Checkout, Google's online payment services
 Check-Out (The Price Is Right), a segment game from The Price Is Right
 in information management, it means blocking a file for editing; see Revision control
 The Checkout, an Australian television series

See also 
 Check-in (disambiguation)